The Thomas B. Fordham Institute is an ideologically conservative American nonprofit education policy think tank, with offices in Washington, D.C., Columbus, Ohio, and Dayton, Ohio. The institute supports and publishes research on education policy in the United States.

History 

The Institute's eponym was a businessman and civic leader in Dayton, Ohio. His widow, Thelma Fordham Pruett, established the Thomas B. Fordham Foundation in 1959 to support a wide range of causes in the Dayton area. In 1997, following the death of Pruett, the Foundation was relaunched, with a narrowed focus on education. The Thomas B. Fordham Institute joined the Thomas B. Fordham Foundation in 2007. In 2013, the Associated Press described the organization as "conservative-leaning."

Fordham-National 

The headquarters of the think-tank operations are located in Washington, D.C. Led by Chester E. Finn Jr. and Michael J. Petrilli, Fordham publishes and supports research on K-12 education across the nation. Additionally, Fordham staff and board members remain involved in organizations that support and develop quality schools.

Fordham-Ohio 

Fordham-Ohio publishes research and does policy work in the Columbus office and serves as a community school sponsor in its Dayton office. The Thomas B. Fordham Foundation was approved in 2004 by the Ohio Department of Education—making it the first nonprofit organization in Ohio to acquire such a responsibility.

Board of Trustees 
Current 
Stephen D. Dackin - Superintendent of School and Community Partnerships, Columbus State Community College
David P. Driscoll - Former Commissioner of Education, Commonwealth of Massachusetts
Chester E. Finn Jr. - Distinguished senior fellow and president emeritus Thomas B. Fordham Institute
Thomas A. Holton, Esq. - Counsel to the Firm Porter Wright Morris & Arthur
Michael W. Kelly - President and CEO, Central Park Credit Bank
Rod Paige - Former U.S. Secretary of Education (2001-2005)
Michael J. Petrilli – President, Thomas B. Fordham Institute
Stefanie Sanford - Chief of Policy, Advocacy, and Government Relations, College Board
Caprice Young - Chief Executive Officer, Magnolia Public Schools

Emeritus
Chester E. Finn, Esq. (1918-2007) - Trustee Emeritus
Craig Kennedy - Trustee Emeritus, German Marshall Fund of the United States
Bruce Kovner - Trustee Emeritus, Caxton Alternative Management LP
Bruno V. Manno - Trustee Emeritus, Walton Family Foundation
David H. Ponitz - Trustee Emeritus, Sinclair Community College
Diane Ravitch - Trustee Emerita

References

External links
 Fordham Institute Profile – National Center for Charitable Statistics (Urban Institute)
 The Thomas B. Fordham Foundation and Institute: Influence for hire, Nonpartisan Education Review

Thomas B. Fordham Foundation
Non-profit organizations based in Washington, D.C.
Organizations established in 1959